The United Kingdom participated in the Eurovision Song Contest 2005 with the song "Touch My Fire" written by Javine Hylton, John Themis and Jonathan Shalit. The song was performed by Javine. The British entry for the 2005 contest in Kyiv, Ukraine was selected via the national final Eurovision: Making Your Mind Up 2005, organised by the British broadcaster BBC. Five acts competed in the national final and the winner was selected entirely through a public vote.

As a member of the "Big Four", the United Kingdom automatically qualified to compete in the final of the Eurovision Song Contest. Performing in position 2, the United Kingdom placed 22nd out of the 24 participating countries with 18 points.

Background

Prior to the 2005 contest, the United Kingdom has participated in the Eurovision Song Contest forty-seven times. Thus far, the United Kingdom has won the contest five times: in 1967 with the song "Puppet on a String" performed by Sandie Shaw, in 1969 with the song "Boom Bang-a-Bang" performed by Lulu, in 1976 with the song "Save Your Kisses for Me" performed by Brotherhood of Man, in 1981 with the song "Making Your Mind Up" performed by Bucks Fizz and in 1997 with the song "Love Shine a Light" performed by Katrina and the Waves. To this point, the nation is noted for having finished as the runner-up in a record fifteen contests. Up to and including 1998, the UK had only twice finished outside the top 10, in 1978 and 1987. Since 1999, the year in which the rule was abandoned that songs must be performed in one of the official languages of the country participating, the UK has had less success, thus far only finishing within the top ten once: in 2002 with the song "Come Back" performed by Jessica Garlick. For the 2004 contest, the United Kingdom finished in sixteenth place out of twenty-four competing entries with the song "Hold On to Our Love" performed by James Fox.

The British national broadcaster, BBC, broadcasts the event within the United Kingdom and organises the selection process for the nation's entry. BBC announced that the United Kingdom would participate in the Eurovision Song Contest 2005 on 28 July 2004. BBC has traditionally organised a national final featuring a competition among several artists and songs to choose the British entry for Eurovision. For their 2005 entry, the broadcaster announced that a national final involving a public vote would be held to select United Kingdom's entry.

Before Eurovision

Eurovision: Making Your Mind Up 2005 

Eurovision: Making Your Mind Up 2005 was the national final developed by the BBC in order to select the British entry for the Eurovision Song Contest 2005. Five acts competed in a televised show on 5 March 2005 held at the BBC Television Centre in London and hosted by Terry Wogan and Natasha Kaplinsky. The winner was selected entirely through a public vote. The show was broadcast on BBC One. The national final was watched by 7.5 million viewers in the United Kingdom.

Competing entries 
The BBC collaborated with record label Sony Music UK to select five finalists to compete in the national final. Entries were provided to the BBC by music industry experts including writers and producers, and an additional five entries were provided by the British Academy of Songwriters, Composers and Authors (BASCA) which ran a songwriting competition amongst its members. The five competing songs were announced on 1 March 2005. Among the competing artists was 1996 British representative Gina G.

Final 
Five acts competed in the televised final on 5 March 2005. In addition to their performances, guest performers included previous Eurovision Song Contest winner Ruslana, who won the contest for Ukraine in 2004 with the song "Wild Dances", and Sonia, who represented the United Kingdom in 1993 with the song "Better the Devil You Know".

A panel of experts provided feedback regarding the songs during the show. The panel consisted of Bruno Tonioli (choreographer, dancer and television personality), Jonathan Ross (television and radio presenter, actor, comedian and producer), Natalie Cassidy (actress) and Paddy O'Connell (television and radio presenter). A public vote consisting of regional televoting, SMS voting and online voting selected the winner, "Touch My Fire" performed by Javine. The results of each televoting region and the online vote awarded 2, 4, 6, 8 and 12 points to their top five songs, while the SMS vote was awarded based on the percentage of votes each song achieved. For example, if a song gained 10% of the SMS vote, then that entry would be awarded 10 points. The public vote in the show registered over 1 million votes.

12 points

At Eurovision
According to Eurovision rules, all nations with the exceptions of the host country, the "Big Four" (France, Germany, Spain and the United Kingdom) and the ten highest placed finishers in the 2004 contest are required to qualify from the semi-final in order to compete for the final; the top ten countries from the semi-final progress to the final. As a member of the "Big Four", the United Kingdom automatically qualified to compete in the final on 21 May 2005. In addition to their participation in the final, the United Kingdom is also required to broadcast and vote in the semi-final on 19 May 2005. During the running order draw for the semi-final and final, the United Kingdom was placed to perform in position 2 in the final, following the entry from Hungary and before the entry from Malta. The United Kingdom placed twenty-second in the final, scoring 18 points.

In the United Kingdom, the semi-final was broadcast on BBC Three with commentary by Paddy O'Connell, while the final was televised on BBC One with commentary by Terry Wogan and broadcast on BBC Radio 2 with commentary by Ken Bruce. The British spokesperson, who announced the British votes during the final, was Cheryl Baker who won the competition for the United Kingdom at the 1981 contest as part of the group Bucks Fizz.

Voting 
Below is a breakdown of points awarded to the United Kingdom and awarded by the United Kingdom in the semi-final and grand final of the contest. The nation awarded its 12 points to Ireland in the semi-final and to Greece in the final of the contest.

Points awarded to the United Kingdom

Points awarded by the United Kingdom

References

2005
Countries in the Eurovision Song Contest 2005
Eurovision
Eurovision